CIAT may refer to:

 Chartered Institute of Architectural Technologists
 CIAT group that provides geothermal energy
 International Center for Tropical Agriculture
 Counter-IED Analysis Team
 Inter-American Center of Tax Administration